Yu Hongzheng (October 5, 1897 – November 11, 1966) was a Chinese chemist. He was a member of the Chinese Academy of Sciences.

References 

1897 births
1966 deaths
Members of the Chinese Academy of Sciences